Wellington City Council v Dominion Budget Rent a Car Ltd (in liq) HC Wellington CP105/87 [1988] NZHC 145 is a cited case in New Zealand regard property law.

References

1988 in New Zealand law
High Court of New Zealand cases
Avis Budget Group
Property case law